HSGP may refer to:

High Sierra Group Proposal, a CD-ROM file system proposal by the High Sierra Group in 1985/1986
Homeland Security Grant Program, to incorporate projects providing funding by the US Department of Homeland Security since 2003
HSGP Investments, a company, who took over Filofax in 2012
Humanist Society of Greater Phoenix